Malarinia is a genus of land snails with an operculum, terrestrial gastropod mollusks in the family Diplommatinidae.

Species
Species within the genus Malarinia include:
 Malarinia calcopercula

References

 Nomenclator Zoologicus info

 
Diplommatinidae
Taxonomy articles created by Polbot